Campione 2000 was the official song of the UEFA Euro 2000 held in the Netherlands and Belgium. It was performed by Swedish musician E-Type and written by E-Type, Rick Blaskey and Kent Brainerd. It gained a huge popularity during the tournament and has since been heard in football games around Europe, both in national and international games. It translates as "Champion" in English.

The chorus of the song resembles the chorus of a Dutch popular song "Oranje Boven" which insist the link between Netherlands with the Royal Dutch Family and a national chant honoring the red-white-blue tricolor Dutch national flag.

The song was included in E-Type's album Euro IV Ever (2001), and in the Sport Edition of Loud Pipes Save Lives (2004). It was also included in The Official Euro 2000 Album.

Track listing
CD maxi - Europe (2000)
 "Campione 2000" (Radio Version) - 3:34
 "Campione 2000" (The Only Earthbound Remix) - 6:39
 "Campione 2000" (Pinocchio Remix) - 4:53
 "Campione 2000" (CF Fonotron Mix) - 2:50

Charts

See also 
Football chant

References

2000 songs
E-Type (musician) songs
Football songs and chants
Macaronic songs
UEFA Euro 2000
UEFA European Championship official songs and anthems